The Interrail Pass is a rail pass available to European residents. Residents of countries outside Europe may purchase the Eurail Pass instead. Types of Interrail Pass include the Interrail Global Pass and the Interrail One Country Pass.

The pass allows unlimited rail travel in (and between) all 33 participating countries for a certain period of time. High-speed trains and night trains often require a paid seat reservation. The Interrail One Country Pass allows unlimited rail travel within one European country.

Eligibility

Interrail passes are available to those who "are citizens or official residents from one of the countries of the European Union or one of the countries listed hereafter": Albania, Andorra, Belarus, Bosnia-Herzegovina, North Macedonia, Gibraltar, Iceland, Kosovo, Liechtenstein, Moldova, Monaco, Montenegro, Norway, Russian Federation, San Marino, Serbia, Switzerland, Turkey, Ukraine, United Kingdom and Vatican City. (For citizens not in the EU or not listed here, Eurail passes are available.) Proof of citizenship or residence may be a passport, identity card, or government-issued residency document.

Age categories

Interrail Passes three age categories and the full fare (adult fare):
Child Pass: For unaccompanied travelers who are younger than 12 years old. Children aged 4 to 11 years old can travel free with a full-fare adult, with a maximum of two children per Adult Pass.
Youth Pass: For travelers who are 27 or under
Adult Pass: No age limitation
Senior Pass: For travelers over 60 years old

Types

Interrail Global Pass

Coverage

The Interrail Global Pass is valid in the following European countries: Austria, Belgium, Bosnia-Herzegovina, Bulgaria, Croatia, Czech Republic, Denmark, Estonia, Finland, France, Germany, Greece, Great Britain, Hungary, Republic of Ireland, Northern Ireland, Italy, Latvia, Lithuania, Luxembourg, Montenegro, the Netherlands, North Macedonia, Norway, Poland, Portugal, Romania, Serbia, Slovakia, Slovenia, Spain, Switzerland, Sweden, and Turkey. Interrail Global Passes include ferry crossings from Patras and Igoumenitsa (Greece) to Venice, Ancona, and Bari (Italy) operated by Superfast Ferries and Blue Star Ferries; fuel surcharges, port taxes, high-season supplements, and cabin accommodations are extra.

Interrail passes are not valid on railways in Albania and the countries of Belarus, Moldova, Russia, and Ukraine. There are no railways in Andorra, Cyprus, the Faroe Islands, Gibraltar, Iceland, Malta, or San Marino. L'Hospitalet-près-l'Andorre in France is the closest railway station for Andorra. Rimini, in Italy, is the closest station for San Marino.

Country of residence

Until the end of 2015, Interrail passes were not valid in the traveller's country of residence, although a discount was granted on journeys to or from the border. On 1 January 2016, the pass became valid for two free journeys in the traveller's  country of residence: one to and one from the border. The limit exists to prevent people from using Interrail for work commuting and business travel.

Validity

The Interrail Global Pass has the following validity options:
 4 days within one month
 5 days within one month
 7 days within one month
 10 days within two months
 15 days within two months
 15 days
 22 days
 1 month
 2 months
 3 months

Interrail One Country Pass
The One Country Pass allows unlimited travel on the rail network of one country, with unlimited journeys on each travel day. One-country passes are available for three, four, five, six, or eight travel days within one month for each of the following countries: Austria, Benelux, Bulgaria, Croatia, Czech Republic, Denmark, Estonia, Finland, France, Germany, Great Britain, Greece, Greek Islands, Hungary, Ireland (Republic of Ireland and Northern Ireland), Italy, Latvia, Lithuania, Norway, Poland, Portugal, Romania, Serbia, Slovakia, Slovenia, Spain, Sweden, Switzerland and Turkey.

There are no separate passes for Belgium, Luxembourg, and the Netherlands, but there is a Benelux pass. It is also available to residents of Belgium, Luxembourg, and the Netherlands, but it is only valid in the two countries other than the country of residence.

Reservations

With an Interrail pass, reservations are usually not required for local and regional trains; however, reservations are needed for most high-speed, international, and night trains. Surcharges are required in many countries to guarantee seat reservations and other benefits, such as meals, drinks, free Wi-Fi, and access to first-class lounges. These reservations can usually be avoided by taking regional or local trains. Reservations may be made at the station, on the rail-company website, with the Rail Planner app, or at a travel agency.

High-speed trains

Many high-speed trains require reservation and, sometimes, an extra fee sold as a supplement or pass-holder fare: 
Eurostar (London, Paris, Amsterdam, and Brussels) services require a compulsory reservation. 2nd class pass holders can travel in Standard class only, 1st class pass holders can travel in either Standard or Standard Premier class. It isn't possible to travel in Business Premier with an Interrail pass. Pass holder fares are quota controlled so it is possible for a train to sell out of pass holder fares before the service is actually fully booked. 
Thalys (Paris to Brussels, Amsterdam, and Cologne) services require a compulsory reservation. 2nd class pass holders can travel in Standard class only, 1st class pass holders can travel in either Comfort or Premium class, the latter, while at no extra cost, is on a first-come first-served basis.
TGV (France): TGV inOui (French Domestic), TGV Lyria (France ↔ Switzerland), TGV France-Italie (France ↔ Italy), Elipsos (France ↔ Spain) and Alleo (France ↔ Luxembourg and Germany) services require a compulsory reservation. The price of the supplement varies from route to route and can also change depending on availability. Passes aren't valid on SNCF's budget Ouigo services. 
Trenitalia (Italy): Frecciabianca, Frecciargento, Frecciarossa, first or second class. Reservations are recommended for intercity trains in Italy.
AVE (Spain) First and second class. Second-class reservation fees are charged on most other long-distance trains in Spain, such as Arco, Euromed, Alvia, Alaris, and Altaria.
ICE train reservations are available.
 The SJ high-speed train (in Sweden, to Copenhagen) requires a reservation, and booking two months in advance is recommended.
Some scenic trains have a panoramic coach, which requires a reservation.

Night trains

In addition to high-speed trains, many overnight trains require reservations (at extra cost) for sleeping accommodations such as couchettes or sleeping cars; some trains have only sleeper cars. With Interrail's Flexi Global Pass, a direct overnight train leaving before midnight only uses one travel day (the day of departure).

Reductions on privately owned trains

Although Interrail passes are normally valid only on national railway systems, some private rail systems offer free or discounted service (usually 25 to 50 percent) to Interrail pass holders.

Literature 

 Julian Trometer: Europe by Train: Backpacking for Beginners, Berlin 2020, ISBN 979-8695597981.
 Nicky Gardner: Europe By Rail: The Definitive Guide, Berlin 2022, ISBN 978-3945225035.
 Marco Polo: Interrail Map + Guide 1:21000000, Stuttgart 2019, ISBN 978-3829739542.

 Caty Ross & Johan Hausen: European Railway Atlas 2022: Designed for Interrail/Eurail Rail Pass, ISBN 978-1911165484.

Timeline

 1972: Interrail Pass began, limited to travellers age 21 or younger. It covered 21 countries: Austria, Belgium, Denmark, East Germany, Finland, France, West Germany, Greece, Hungary, Ireland, Italy, Luxembourg, the Netherlands, Norway, Poland, Portugal, Spain, Sweden, Switzerland, United Kingdom, and Yugoslavia. The price in the United Kingdom was £27.50 for one month's travel.
 1973: UK price increased to £33.00
 1976: The age limit for the pass was raised to 23; it was raised again to 26 in 1979.
 1979: Interrail Senior, for travellers over 65, was introduced.
 1982: The six-month residency requirement was introduced.
 1985: Some ferry services were included.

 1989: An adult offer was introduced in the Nordic countries, with 265 adult passengers in the first year.
 1991: The end of the Soviet Union led to expansion of the Interrail zone, and an adult offer was introduced in the UK.
 1994: Twenty-nine of the 33 present-day countries are included (all except Bosnia-Herzegovina); the IRC has seven zones, with Zone D including Poland, Czech Republic, Slovakia, Hungary, Croatia, Bulgaria, Romania, and Yugoslavia.
 1998: Interrail passes become available to all ages, with fares based on age. The eight-zone system is established, omitting Bosnia-Herzegovina.
 2001: The Eurail Group is formed, taking over marketing and management of Interrail and Eurail.
 2005: Bosnia-Herzegovina joins the IRC.
 2007: On April 1, the Eurail Group takes over all Interrail Pass products; zone system replaced with Interrail Global Pass (30 participating countries) and One Country Pass range. Eurodomino discontinued.
 2013: Launch of the Rail Planner app
 2015: Eurail and Interrail align their logos; Greek Islands Pass introduced.
 2017: Youth fare age limit raised to 27.
 2018: Turkey and Serbia join Eurail One-country Pass. Czech Republic and Poland join Eurail two-country select pass.
 2019: 1st and 2nd class are available for all products (except Greek Islands domestic). Furthermore, Lithuanian Railways join Interrail. The New Greek Islands Pass is now also valid for 5 domestic trips and increases to 53 islands. It was announced that railway operators in the United Kingdom would cease participation in the scheme after a dispute, however this decision was promptly reversed. 
 2020: Estonia and Latvia join Interrail.
 2022: Interrail and Eurrail introduce a new joint logo along with a brand identity refresh.

DiscoverEU
In 2015, German activists Vincent-Immanuel Herr and Martin Speer approached European Commission vice-president Frans Timmermans with a proposal to provide all EU youth with a free one-month Interrail Global Pass
at age 18. Their effort was documented by Politico Europe's Brussels Playbook. According to Herr and Speer, their idea would help to overcome stereotypes in Europe and problems with nationalism in several countries by enabling a whole generation (not just a small fraction of it) to explore Europe. They subsequently wrote a number of articles about their idea, started a change.org petition, and approached more EU politicians. 

The idea was picked up by a number of EU politicians in 2016, including Rebecca Harms, Karima Delli, Michael Cramer, István Ujhelyi, Manfred Weber, and Alexander Graf Lambsdorff. A 2016 German survey found that 56 percent of respondents were in favor of such a proposal, and Herr promoted the idea at a 2017 TEDx event.

In March 2018, a €12 million pilot project to purchase 20,000-30,000 Global Passes for EU youth was confirmed by the European Commission. A press release announcing the decision elaborated on its goal of the scheme: "The action will seek to offer young people, regardless of social or educational background and including people with reduced mobility, a chance to travel abroad." On 1 March 2018, the European Commission announced initial steps to implement the European Parliament's proposal for a "Free Interrail pass for Europeans turning 18" by adopting a financing decision: "With a budget of EUR 12 million in 2018, this action is expected to give an estimated 20,000-30,000 young people a travel experience that would help foster a European identity, reinforce common European values and promote the discovery of European sites and cultures. This proposal fits well with the EU's ambitions to promote learning mobility, active citizenship, social inclusion and solidarity of all young people."

On 3 May 2018, Commissioner for Education, Culture, Youth and Sport Tibor Navracsics and Manfred Weber MEP announced that the initiative would be called DiscoverEU and outlined the first details on the application process. The initiative aims to give 15,000 young people the opportunity to travel around Europe during the summer to discover the continent's rich cultural heritage, get in touch with other people, learn from other cultures, and discover what unites Europe. Participants can travel up to 30 days and  visit one to four foreign destinations. In an application round to select the first 15,000 travelers, those interested needed to apply during a two-week period in June 2018 through the European Youth Portal.

See also

 Rail transport in Europe
 Transport in Europe

References

External links

 Interrail.eu, The official Interrail website for all Europeans in English, Dutch, Spanish, German, Italian and French.
 InterrailPass.org , website application for planning Interrail routes and booking accommodation.
 Seat61, extensive guides to Interrail and European train travel in general.
 Interrail Pass, Interrail Advice and Interrail Routes.
 Railtripping.com, Interrail & train travel in Europe

Rail transport in Europe
Rail passes